César Manuel “Danco” García Peralta (born 13 March 1993) is a Dominican professional footballer who plays as a defender for Bolivian club Real Santa Cruz and the Dominican Republic national team.

International career

International goals
Scores and results list the Dominican Republic's goal tally first.

Honours
 Cibao
CFU Club Championship (1): 2017

References

External links
 
 
 
 
 

1993 births
Living people
People from La Vega Province
Association football defenders
Dominican Republic footballers
Dominican Republic international footballers
Dominican Republic under-20 international footballers
Dominican Republic expatriate footballers
Expatriate footballers in Bolivia
Dominican Republic expatriate sportspeople in Puerto Rico
Dominican Republic expatriate sportspeople in Bolivia
Expatriate footballers in Puerto Rico
Liga Dominicana de Fútbol players
North American Soccer League players
Bolivian Primera División players
Puerto Rico Islanders players
Bayamón FC players
Bauger FC players
Cibao FC players
Real Santa Cruz players